Stormbringer is a fantasy tabletop role-playing game published under license by Chaosium. Based on the Elric of Melniboné books by Michael Moorcock, the game takes its name from Elric's sword, Stormbringer (though one edition was published as Elric!). The rules are based on Chaosium's percentile-dice-based Basic Role-Playing system.

System
The game uses a variant of Chaosium's Basic Roleplaying, with its own rules for magic and other setting-specific elements. The first three editions are functionally similar, while the fourth edition changed the magic system extensively. Elric! was a substantial reworking of the game, and Stormbringer fifth edition consists of the Elric! rules with additional material from several older, out-of-print supplements incorporated.

History
Chaosium had already published a boardgame based on Moorcock's Elric of Melniboné series, called Elric in 1977. There have been several editions of the tabletop role-playing game: 

 1st edition (1981) by Ken St. Andre and Steve Perrin; boxed set
 2nd edition (1985) by St. Andre; boxed set
 3rd edition (1987) by St. Andre, published jointly with Games Workshop
 4th edition (1990) by St. Andre, Steve Perrin, and John B. Monroe; boxed set
 Elric! (1993) by Lynn Willis, Richard Watts, Mark Morrison, Jimmie W. Pursell Jr., Sam Shirley, and Joshua Shaw.
 The adventure The Bronze Grimoire (1994) for use with Elric!
 5th edition (2001) by Lynn Willis

In 2007 Chaosium dropped their Eternal Champion license, and it was picked up by Mongoose Publishing. In August 2007, they published Elric of Melniboné by Lawrence Whittaker, which is based on Moongoose's first edition of RuneQuest. A second edition by Lawrence Whittaker and Pete Nash was published in 2010, based on Mongoose's second edition of Runequest. This was discontinued when Mongoose lost the RuneQuest license in 2011.

Publications
Black Sword
The Shattered Isle
Stealer of Souls

Reception
In the February–March 1982 edition of White Dwarf (Issue #29), Murray Writtle gave it an average overall rating of 7 out of 10, and stated that "So, if you want to have single death or glory adventures in the Young Kingdoms, Stormbringer will give you them, but to get a continuing campaign underway will take a certain amount of rewriting and careful thought."

In the January–February 1985 edition of Different Worlds (Issue #38), Keith Herber gave it a top rating of 4 stars out of 4, saying, "I thought Stormbringer not only an excellent adaptation of the Elric series but also found it an extremely enjoyable game. If you have ever read an Elric book (or one of Moorcock's related novels) and wished it could be a game, this is it. If you haven't read one yet do so and then consider the game. You may not find the "doomed" atmosphere to your liking, but around this neighborhood there is a growing movement for a permanent Stormbringer campaign."

In the August 1987 edition of White Dwarf (Issue #92), Jim Bambra called the percentile-based skill resolution system "quick and simple to play." He also liked the experience system, calling it "simple and easy to use with no unwieldy book-keeping required between game sessions." He concluded with a strong recommendation, saying, "Come and enter the world of Elric, you won't be disappointed."

In a 1996 poll of readers conducted by Arcane to determine the 50 most popular roleplaying games of all time, Stormbringer was ranked 25th.  Editor Paul Pettengale commented: "A simplified RuneQuest, only set in Elric's world. It captures the spirit of the books, but to play it properly you really need to be familiar with the novels, and they are of the type of fantasy that you either love or loathe."

See also
Hawkmoon (role-playing game)
Dragon Lords of Melniboné

References

External links
 Stormbringer! – a website supporting all editions of the Stormbringer RPG

Basic Role-Playing System
Chaosium games
Dark fantasy role-playing games
Michael Moorcock's Multiverse
Lynn Willis games
Role-playing games based on novels
Role-playing games introduced in 1981